Captain Mack is a British children's television show set in the town of Sunshine City. It was created and developed by John Lomas Bullivant, at Fireback Entertainment, and was first broadcast in February 2008. The series formerly ran on CITV from 1 February 2008 to 21 March 2010 and reran from 22 March 2010 to 6 January 2013 and Tiny Pop.

In Australia, it was shown on ABC2 (ABC For Kids On 2). It also ran in New Zealand on TVNZ 7 and aired on Cartoonito in 2013, earlier than before. Many of its episodes are now available for free on its official YouTube Channel.

Plot
Captain Mack is based in Sky Rocket Control, with his trusty monkey engineer Samson. They keep an eye on the residents of Sunshine City, particularly the naughty ones (Marty Meddler, Tracy Trickster, and Grabby Crabby). Sunshine City is bright, colourful clean and cheerful, inhabited by some of the nicest people you could ever meet.

These include Yolanda Yummy (cook), Peter Patent (inventor), Fineas Fixit (odd job man), Dr Quack (GP), Daisy Digger (gardener), Wendy Whizz (keep fit fanatic), Camilla Divine (artist), Maximus Volume (singer) and Rosie Raucous (saleswoman).

Captain Mack always leaves with the phase "Shucks, I have to go. My monkey needs me." When there is trouble in Sunshine City, Captain Mack uses the phrase, "Sky Rockets to the rescue!"

External links
Official website
Official YouTube Channel
CITV

ITV children's television shows
2000s preschool education television series
2010s preschool education television series
British children's science fiction television series
2000s British children's television series